Muzio Dandini (8 November 1634 – 15 April 1712) was an Italian Roman Catholic prelate who served as Bishop of Senigallia (1686–1712).

Biography
Muzio Dandini was born in Cesene, Italy. 
On 1 April 1686, he was appointed during the papacy of Pope Innocent XI as Bishop of Senigallia. 
On 15 April 1686, he was consecrated bishop by Alessandro Crescenzi (cardinal), Cardinal-Priest of Santa Prisca, with Francesco Casati, Titular Archbishop of Trapezus, and Marcantonio Barbarigo, Archbishop of Corfù, serving as co-consecrators. 
He served as Bishop of Senigallia until his death on 7 August 1712.

Episcopal succession
While bishop, he was the principal co-consecrator of:
Giovanni Rasponi, Bishop of Forlì (1689); 
Jan Gomoliński, Bishop of Kyiv and Chernihiv (1700); and
Alessandro Roncovieri, Bishop of Borgo San Donnino (1700).

References

External links 
 (for Chronology of Bishops) 
 (for Chronology of Bishops) 

17th-century Italian Roman Catholic bishops
Bishops appointed by Pope Innocent XI
1634 births
1686 deaths